Johan Baptista or Hans van Uther (died 1597) was a Dutch Renaissance painter, active in Sweden.

Life and works
No personal details are known about Johan Baptista van Uther, and no signed works by his hand survive. He is thought to have been born in either Antwerp or Utrecht. He was active in Sweden, from 1562 as court painter. Several portraits have been attributed to him, notably portraits of King John III of Sweden, dowager Queen Catherine Stenbock and the future King of Poland and Grand Duke of Lithuania, Sigismund III Vasa.

Stylistically, portraits attributed to Johan Baptista van Uther show influences from the refined court style of Antonis Mor. In turn, Johan Baptista van Uther taught and influenced court portraitist Holger Hansson and, possibly, Cornelius Arendtz.

References

External links

1597 deaths
Dutch Renaissance painters
16th-century Swedish painters
Swedish male painters
Year of birth unknown